The Offaly–Tipperary rivalry is a hurling rivalry between Irish county teams Offaly and Tipperary.
Both teams play provincial hurling, Tipperary in the Munster Senior Hurling Championship and Offaly in the Leinster Senior Hurling Championship. All of their championship meetings have been in the All-Ireland Senior Hurling Championship, the first being in 2002.

References

External links
Offaly v Tipperary all-time results

Tipperary
Tipperary county hurling team rivalries